The Prime Minister of Mongolia is the head of government of Mongolia and heads the Mongolian cabinet. The Prime Minister is appointed by the Mongolian parliament or the State Great Hural, and can be removed by the parliament with a vote of no confidence.

The incumbent prime minister is Luvsannamsrain Oyun-Erdene, who has served since 27 January 2021. He replaced Ukhnaagiin Khürelsükh, who was elected to the presidency.

Powers
The Prime Minister has full powers to hire and fire his cabinet ministers and appoints the governors of the 21 aimags of Mongolia, as well as the governor of the capital, Ulaanbaatar.

History
The office of Prime Minister was established in 1912, shortly after (Outer) Mongolia first declared independence from the Manchu Qing Dynasty. This was not recognized by many nations.  By the time of Mongolia's second (and more generally recognized) declaration of independence (from the Chinese republic) in 1921, the office was controlled by a Communist group known as the Mongolian People's Revolutionary Party. 1924 the party established the Mongolian People's Republic, and the Prime Minister's post was superseded by one known by the title "Chairman of the Council of People's Commissars". This was changed to "Chairman of the Council of Ministers" in 1946. The title of Prime Minister was only revived in 1990, when the People's Revolutionary Party gradually released its hold on power. Regardless of the changes of name, however, the modern Mongolian government recognizes the office as having existed continuously since 1912, and counts all holders of the office as Prime Ministers.

There is some confusion as to the first holder of the office. A lama named Tseren (or Tserenchimed) held office as "Prime Minister" during a provisional government, and is sometimes cited as the first holder of the modern office. However, the current Mongolian government considers Tögs-Ochiryn Namnansüren, the first formal office-holder, to be the first. There is also some confusion over the status of Tsengeltiin Jigjidjav - some consider him to have only been acting Prime Minister, while some consider him to have been a full Prime Minister. The Mongolian government takes the latter view.

List of prime ministers

See also
President of Mongolia
List of presidents of Mongolia

Notes

References

External links
 Official website of the Mongolian government (in Mongolian)

 
Government of Mongolia
1912 establishments in Mongolia
1992 establishments in Mongolia